Smallett is an unincorporated community in southern Douglas County, Missouri, United States. It is located approximately nine miles south of Ava and is located on Missouri Supplemental Route A. It previously had its own post office from 1888-1967 with ZIP code 65750, but mail is now served by the post office in Ava. Some say Smallett was named for its first postmaster, James Small, while others believe the name honors another early settler.

Smallett lies on the South Spring Creek about three miles north of the Douglas–Ozark county line.

References

Unincorporated communities in Douglas County, Missouri
Unincorporated communities in Missouri